In Greek mythology, Cepheus (Ancient Greek: Κηφεύς Kepheús) may refer to the following personages:

 Cepheus, king of Ethiopia and father of Andromeda.
 Cepheus, king of Tegea in Arcadia and one of the Argonauts.
 Cepheus, one of the comrades of the Greek hero Odysseus. When the latter and 12 of his crew came into the port of Sicily, the Cyclops Polyphemus seized and confined them. The monster then slain Cepheus and five others namely: Antiphon, Euryleon, Apheidas, Stratios and Menetos, while the remaining six survived.

Notes

References 

 Apollodorus, The Library with an English Translation by Sir James George Frazer, F.B.A., F.R.S. in 2 Volumes, Cambridge, MA, Harvard University Press; London, William Heinemann Ltd. 1921. ISBN 0-674-99135-4. Online version at the Perseus Digital Library. Greek text available from the same website.
 Tzetzes, John, Allegories of the Odyssey translated by Goldwyn, Adam J. and Kokkini, Dimitra. Dumbarton Oaks Medieval Library, Harvard University Press, 2015. 

Characters in Greek mythology